Waymond Cecil "Sonny" Huggins (September 3, 1927 – January 22, 2016) of LaFayette, Georgia, U.S., was a state politician and forest ranger in the state of Georgia.

Huggins served eight terms in the Georgia State Senate, where he represented the 53rd District. Huggins was a Democrat.
He was elected for the first time in 1983 after a career as a forest ranger for the United States Forestry Service and the Georgia Forestry Commission.

References

External links
State legislature biography for 1997–1998 session
State legislature biography for 1999–2000 session

Democratic Party Georgia (U.S. state) state senators
1927 births
2016 deaths
Baptists from Georgia (U.S. state)
People from LaFayette, Georgia
United States Forest Service officials
20th-century American politicians
21st-century American politicians
20th-century Baptists